Aris Portosalte is a journalist of the Greek radio station Skai 100.3 and the TV channel Skai TV. He has been a journalist since 1984. In 1989, he started working as a newspaper reporter. Then he continued as a radio producer for Skai 100.3. Since 1991, he presents news broadcasts on the radio where he has his own radio show. He also writes articles at the newspaper Kathimerini and he participates as a guest commenter at the news of Skai TV. Recently he became famous for his commentary on the Greek government-debt crisis. He was also journalist and coordinator of the famous TV show series of Skai TV 1821; the birth of a nation (2011).

On December 17, 2014 Portosalte started the presentation of the new radio series Knowing our history - The Birth of an archipelago in collaboration with the Natural History Museum of the Lesvos Petrified Forest and the Universities of Aegean, Crete & Thessaloniki.

In 2021 The Journalists' Union of the Athens Daily Newspapers permanently deleted him from its membership for anti-strike activity.

References

Living people
Greek journalists
Radio in Greece
Year of birth missing (living people)
Constantinopolitan Greeks
Journalists from Istanbul
Journalists from Athens